Chief Francis Meshioye is a Nigerian esotericist. He currently serves as the Olori Oluwo of the Reformed Ogboni Fraternity, a Nigerian fraternal order.

References

Living people
Esotericists
Nigerian businesspeople
Year of birth missing (living people)